Deh-e Qazi or Deh Qazi may refer to various places in Iran:
 Deh-e Qazi, Kerman
 Deh-e Qazi, Shahr-e Babak, Kerman Province
 Deh-e Qazi, Zarand, Kerman Province
 Deh Qazi, Kohgiluyeh and Boyer-Ahmad
 Deh-e Qazi, Damghan, Semnan Province